Jide is a Nigerian and Chinese given name that may refer to

Jide Kosoko (born 1954), Nigerian actor
Jide Obi (born 1962), Nigerian musician
Jide Olugbodi (born 1977), Nigerian footballer 
Jide Omokore, Nigerian businessman 
Jide Orire (born 1963), Nigerian Pentecostal bishop 
Wu Jide (born 1955), Chinese politician

See also
 Remix OS